Club de Rugby El Salvador, known for sponsorship reasons as SilverStorm El Salvador on the men's category and as Crealia El Salvador on the women's, is a Spanish rugby union club. The club was established in 1960 and currently competes in the men's División de Honor de Rugby and in the women's División de Honor Femenina de Rugby competitions, the highest levels of Spanish club rugby. The club is based in Valladolid in central Spain, playing their matches at the Estadio Pepe Rojo. The club's colours are black and white.

El Salvador is one of the most successful Spanish rugby union clubs, having won División de Honor in seven times, Copa del Rey in six times and Supercopa de España in five times.

Recent history
El Salvador were relegated to the second-tier Primera Division, in 1995/96 season, spending one season in the second-tier Primera División, but immediately returned to the División de Honor after topping the table in the 1996/97 season. That success was followed by the side's winning the División de Honor in the 1997/98, becoming the first newly-promoted team to win the title. The following season led to two more titles: the Ibero Cup and another Copa del Rey, adding to the club's distinguished history.

Two more titles followed in the 1999/2000 and 2001/02 seasons. In 2004/05 and 2005/06 the club finished as runners up in the league, but won the Copa del Rey twice, along with a new Ibero Cup and two Spanish Super Cups.

In the 2003/04 season, CR El Salvador participated in a European competition for the first time, debuting against Harlequins in London, before going out in the second round - a first for a Spanish club - to the Italian team Rovigo.

In the 2006/07 season, they won all three titles at senior level: División de Honor, the Copa del Rey and the Super Cup title.

In the 2007/08 season, it was yet another excellent year for the team, as they won the Division de Honor and the Super Cup title.

In the Amlin Challenge cup in 2010/2011, they won Petrarca Padova rugby in Pepe Rojo stadium (37-16)

Honors
Spanish League: 8
1990–91, 1997–98, 2002–03, 2003–04, 2006–07, 2007–08, 2009–10, 2015–16
Copa del Rey: 7
1993, 1999, 2005, 2006, 2007, 2011, 2016
Supercopa: 6
2003, 2004, 2005, 2006, 2007, 2018
Copa Ibérica: 4
1992, 1999, 2004, 2005

Season by season

38 seasons in División de Honor

International honours 
  Juan Murré
  Uale Mai
  Esera Lauina
  Joe Mamea
  Manuel Serrano
  Jaime Nava
 Julio Álvarez
  Pablo Feijoo
  Carlos Souto
  Sergio Souto
  Iván Criado
  Javier Miranda
  Salé Ibarra
  "Toche"
  César Sempere
  James Faiva
  Matthew Bede Smith

Other notable players 
  Sam Katz (England Students International)
  Gillies Kaka capped by New Zealand 7s)
  Jacob Kennedy (signs from Hawke's Bay, capped by New Zealand Under 19)
  Andy Long (England international)
  Charlie O'Connell (signs from Canterbury, capped by New Zealand Under 19)
  Joe McDonnell (New Zealand international)
  David Palu (Tonga international)
  Regardt Van Eyk (former player from Mighty Elephants in the Currie Cup)
  Justin Wilson (former player from Auckland Blues, Hurricanes and Chiefs in Super12/14. Capped by New Zealand Māoris and New Zealand 7s)
●Hansie Graff (signed from SWD Eagles, also played for Bayonne and the Sharks.)

Notable Signings

Sam Katz - England Students national rugby union team whose previous club was Loughborough Students RUFC. Highest scorer of 328 points in the División de Honor for 2014/15 season and 388 points for 2015/16 season.
Uale Mai – Manu Samoa and Samoa Sevens international, 2006 IRB International Sevens Player of the Year, signed for 2010–11.
Joe McDonnell - New Zealand international signed from Newcastle Falcons as player coach for 2009/10 season.
Andy Long - England national rugby union team international signed from Newcastle Falcons as player for 2009/10 season. He signed for Northampton Saints in half of the season.

See also
Rugby union in Spain
Spanish rugby union players
Spanish rugby union competitions

External links
Official website
Spanish Rugby website

Spanish rugby union teams
Sport in Valladolid
Rugby clubs established in 1960
Sports teams in Castile and León